Kasei is the Japanese word for Mars. It may also refer to:

Places
 Kasei Valles, a canyon on Mars
 Kasei, Kenya, a village in Kenya
 Kasei, Ghana, a village in Ghana

Transportation
 Mitsubishi Kasei, a World War II aircraft engine used on many Japanese warplanes
 Kasei Station, a train station on the Fujikyuko Line in Tsuru, Yamanashi, Japan
 Toritsu-Kasei Station, a train station on the Seibu Shinjuku Line in Nakano, Tokyo, Japan

Educational institutions
 Tokyo Kasei-Gakuin University, a private university in Tokyo
 Tokyo Kasei-Gakuin Junior College, a women's university in Tokyo
 Tokyo Kasei University, a private university in Tokyo

Other
 Asahi Kasei, a Japanese chemical conglomerate
 Rakuto Kasei, a Japanese multinational chemical company

See also